= Association of Newspaper and Magazine Wholesalers =

The Association of Newspaper and Magazine Wholesalers (ANMW) is a trade association that represents the interests of newspaper & magazine wholesalers across the United Kingdom. It is currently based in Reading, Berkshire.

== History ==
The ANMW was formed in 1904 when three wholesalers in Lancashire joined forces to form a wholesale trade association. This quickly grew to include wholesalers in Yorkshire, Leeds and Sheffield. In 1908 the group became known as The Provincial Wholesaler Association (PWNA), the first recognised body in England and Wales to work together on matters concerning the wholesale trade.

== Membership ==
The ANMW is a non-profit making organisation with admission agreed by the membership. Applicants must be wholesalers of national newspapers or hold two out of the three major magazine distributor contracts.

Affiliate membership is also available for those with a limited product range or fewer than 150 retail customers.
